Donald Harrison Jr. (born June 23, 1960) is an African-American jazz saxophonist and the Big Chief of The Congo Square Nation Afro-New Orleans Cultural Group from New Orleans, Louisiana. 

He was awarded an Honorary Doctorate by the Berklee College of Music in 2021. He is also an NEA Jazz Master. He is the uncle and former tutor of Chief Xian aTunde Adjuah, also known as Christian Scott aTunde Adjuah.

Biography
Harrison was born to Big Chief Donald Harrison Sr in 1960 in New Orleans, Louisiana. 

The foundation of Harrison's music comes from his lifelong participation in New Orleans culture. He started in New Orleans second-line culture and studied New Orleans secret tribal culture, under his father, Big Chief Donald Harrison Sr. Whereas, Harrison Jr. is currently the Chief of Congo Square in Afro-New Orleans Culture.  He studied at the Berklee College of Music. As a professional musician he worked with Roy Haynes and Jack McDuff, before joining Art Blakey and the Jazz Messengers with Terence Blanchard and recorded albums in a quintet until 1989. Two years later, Harrison released a tribute album to Blakey, For Art's Sake. This was followed by an album that reached into Harrison's New Orleans heritage, with guest appearances by Dr. John and Cyrus Chestnut and chants by the Guardians of the Flame Mardi Gras Indians. He devoted half the album, Nouveau Swing (1997), to mixing the swing beat of modern acoustic jazz, with modern dance music and half to mixing the swing beat with Caribbean-influenced music. On the next album, his experiments continued by mixing modern jazz's swing beat with hip hop, Latin music, R&B, and smooth jazz.

His albums, 3D Vols. I, II, and III, present him in three different musical genres. On Vol. I he writes, plays, and produces smooth jazz and R&B style. On Vol. II he writes, produces and plays in the classic jazz style. On Vol. III he writes plays and produces hip hop.

His group, Donald Harrison Electric Band, has recorded popular radio hits and has charted in the top ten of Billboard magazine. He performs as a producer, singer, and rapper in traditional New Orleans jazz and hip hop genres with his group, The New Sounds of Mardi Gras. The group, which has recorded two albums, was started in 2001 and has made appearances worldwide. In 1999, Harrison was named the Big Chief of the Congo Nation Afro-New Orleans Cultural Group, which keeps alive the secret traditions of Congo Square.

In 2016, Harrison recorded his first orchestral work with the Moscow Symphony Orchestra. He followed up the piece for the MSO by writing classical orchestral works for the Thailand Philharmonic Orchestra, The New York Chamber Orchestra, and The Jalapa Symphony Orchestra in 2017.

Harrison has nurtured a number of young musicians including trumpeter Christian Scott (Harrison's nephew), Mark Whitfield, Christian McBride, and The Notorious B.I.G. Harrison was in Spike Lee's HBO documentary, When the Levees Broke, and has appeared as himself in eleven episodes of the television series, Treme.

Harrison was chosen Person of the Year by Jazziz magazine in January 2007.

Personal life 
He is married to Mary Alicė Spears-Harrison and the father of Victoria Harrison.

Discography

As leader
 1990: Full Circle (Sweet Basil)
 1991: For Art's Sake (Candid)
 1992: Indian Blues (Candid) with Dr. John
 1994: The Power of Cool (CTI)
 1997: Nouveau Swing (Impulse!)
 1999: Free to Be (Impulse!)
 2000: Spirits of Congo Square (Candid)
 2001: Real Life Stories (Nagel Heyer)
 2002: Kind of New (Candid) 
 2003: Paradise Found (Fomp)
 2004: Heroes (Nagel Heyer)
 2004: Free Style (Nagel Heyer)
 2005: New York Cool: Live at The Blue Note (Half Note) 
 2005: 3D (Fomp)
 2006: The Survivor (Nagel Heyer)
 2008: The Chosen (Nagel Heyer)
 2011: This Is Jazz: Live at The Blue Note (Half Note)

As co-leader with Terence Blanchard
 1983: New York Second Line (Concord)
 1984: Discernment (Concord)
 1986: Nascence (Columbia)
 1986: Eric Dolphy & Booker Little Remembered Live at Sweet Basil, Vol. 1 (Evidence)
 1986: Fire Waltz: Eric Dolphy & Booker Little Remembered Live At Sweet Basil, Vol. 2 (Evidence)
 1987: Crystal Stair (Columbia)
 1988: Black Pearl (Columbia)

As sideman
With Art Blakey
 Oh-By the Way (Timeless, 1982)
 New York Scene (Concord, 1984)
 Blue Night (Timeless, 1985)
 New Year's Eve at Sweet Basil (Evidence, 1985)

With Joanne Brackeen
Turnaround (Evidence, 1992)

With The Headhunters
 Evolution Revolution (Basin Street, 2003)
 Speakers In The House (Ropeadope, 2022)

Withe, 2022) the Brian Lynch/Eddie Palmieri Project
 Simpático (ArtistShare, 2007)

With Eddie Palmieri
 Palmas (Elektra Nonesuch, 1995)
 Arete  (RMM, 1995)
 Vortex (RMM, 1996)
 Listen Here! (Concord, 2005)
 Wisdom/Sabiduria (Ropeadope, 2017)

With Don Pullen
 The Sixth Sense (Black Saint, 1985)

With Lonnie Smith
 Rise Up! (Palmetto, 2008)

With Esperanza Spalding
 Esperanza (Heads Up, 2008)

'With Jane Monheit
 Taking a Chance on Love (Sony Music Entertainment, 2004)

On DVD
 Live with Clark Terry
 Live at the Supper Club'' with Lena Horne

References

External links

 
 Donald Harrison Jr. Interview NAMM Oral History Library (2017)

1960 births
Living people
African-American saxophonists
American jazz saxophonists
American male saxophonists
Hard bop saxophonists
Jazz-funk saxophonists
Jazz musicians from New Orleans
The Jazz Messengers members
Post-bop saxophonists
Columbia Records artists
Impulse! Records artists
21st-century saxophonists
American male jazz musicians
The Eleventh House members
CTI Records artists
Candid Records artists
Concord Records artists
Nagel-Heyer Records artists
African-American Catholics